Monkey Man may refer to:
"Monkey Man" (Rolling Stones song), 1969
"Monkey Man" (Toots & the Maytals song), a 1969 minor UK hit song, or the title-album released in 1970
"Monkey Man", a song by Baby Huey & the Babysitters
"Monkey Man", a song by David Byrne from the album Uh-Oh
"Monkey Man", a song by Dave Matthews Band recorded during The Lillywhite Sessions
"Monkey Man", a song from the Glenn Hughes album Music for the Divine
 Axwell Tiberius, the eponymous simian character in the comic book Monkeyman and O'Brien
Jyoti Raju, who earned himself the title Monkey Man by climbing walls with no aid with a technique he learned from monkeys
Monkey Man (film), a film starring and directed by English actor Dev Patel
Bukit Timah Monkey Man, a legendary creature said to inhabit Singapore
Monkey-man of Delhi, an Indian urban legend